The Priest from Kirchfeld (German:Der Pfarrer von Kirchfeld) is a 1926 German silent film directed by Jacob Fleck and Luise Fleck and starring William Dieterle, Fritz Kampers and Dieter Melzer. It is based on the play Der Pfarrer von Kirchfeld by Ludwig Anzengruber, one of a number of film adaptations of the work.

The film's sets were designed by the art director Hans Rouc.

Cast
 William Dieterle as Pfarrer 
 Fritz Kampers
 Dieter Melzer
 Eduard Sekler
 Anton Amon
 Hans Melzer
 Margarete Lanner
 Hedwig Wangel
 Robert Mahr as Dorfschullehrer 
 Gustav Adolf Semler 
 Max Neufeld

References

Bibliography
 Goble, Alan. The Complete Index to Literary Sources in Film. Walter de Gruyter, 1999.

External links

1926 films
Films of the Weimar Republic
Films directed by Luise Fleck
Films directed by Jacob Fleck
German silent feature films
German films based on plays
Films based on works by Ludwig Anzengruber
Films about Catholic priests
Remakes of Austrian films
Films set in the Alps
German black-and-white films